This is a list of events in South African Sport in 1977.

Football (Soccer)

January
 11 January - South Africa (Bafana Bafana) draws with Zambia 0-0 at the Independence Stadium, Lusaka, Zambia in the World Cup qualifiers

April
 6 April - Bafana Bafana loses to Congo 0-2 at the Municipal Stadium, Pointe Noire, Congo in the World Cup qualifiers
 27 April - Bafana Bafana beats Zaire 2-1 at the Municipal Stadium, Lomé, Togo in the World Cup qualifiers

May
 24 May - Bafana Bafana loses to England 1-2 at the Old Trafford, Manchester, England in a friendly match

June
 4 June - Bafana Bafana loses to the Netherlands 0-2 in the Nelson Mandela Challenge held in the FNB Stadium, Johannesburg
 8 June - Bafana Bafana beats Zambia 3-0 at Soccer City, Johannesburg in the World Cup qualifiers

August
 16 August - Bafana Bafana beats Congo 1-0 at Soccer City, Johannesburg in the World Cup qualifiers

October
 11 October - Bafana Bafana loses to France 1-2 at Felix Bollaert Stadium, Lens, France in a friendly match

November
 15 November - Bafana Bafana loses to Germany 3-0 at Rheinstadion, Düsseldorf, Germany in a friendly match

December
 7 December - Bafana Bafana loses to Brazil 1-2 at Ellis Park Stadium, Johannesburg in a friendly match
 13 December - Bafana Bafana team draws with the Czech Republic 2-2 at King Fahd Stadium, Riyadh, Saudi Arabia in the Confederations Cup
 15 December - Bafana Bafana loses to the United Arab Emirates 0-1 at King Fahd Stadium, Riyadh, Saudi Arabia in the Confederations Cup
 17 December - Bafana Bafana loses to Uruguay 3-4 at King Fahd Stadium, Riyadh, Saudi Arabia in the Confederations Cup

See also
1996 in South African sport
1997 in South Africa
1998 in South African sport 
List of years in South African sport

 
South Africa